John "Frenchy" Boulos (June 7, 1921, in Haiti – January 16, 2002, in Brooklyn, New York) was a Haitian soccer player, who spent most of his career in the American Soccer League and German-American Soccer League. He is a member of the National Soccer Hall of Fame. Boulos is the grandfather of women's soccer player Kimberly Boulos.

Early years
Boulos was born in Port-au-Prince, Haiti to a family of Lebanese descent. He attended school at Saint-Louis de Gonzague in Haiti before migrating to the United States in 1930 at age nine, where his family settled in Brooklyn, New York. He attended the Manual Training School where he won the New York City Championship and led the league in scoring, as well as being selected as league MVP. In addition to his school team, Boulos also played for the Bay Ridge Hearts junior team.

Club career
At some point, Boulos played for Sequra in the Metropolitan League and then for Brooklyn Hispano in the American Soccer League. During World War II, he joined the U.S. Army Air Forces and was stationed in India. When he returned from the war, Boulos rejoined Hispano, playing with them until 1949. That year, he moved to New York Hakoah. In 1953, he moved to Lithuanian Sport in the German-American Soccer League, winning the GASL and New York State Cup titles in 1954.

Honors

Individual
Inducted into the United States National Soccer Hall of Fame: 1980

References

External links

1921 births
2002 deaths
Sportspeople from Port-au-Prince
American sportspeople of Haitian descent
American people of Lebanese descent
Haitian people of Lebanese descent
Sportspeople of Lebanese descent
Haitian emigrants to the United States
American soccer players
American Soccer League (1933–1983) players
Brooklyn Hispano players
New York Hakoah players
German-American Soccer League players
National Soccer Hall of Fame members
Sportspeople from Brooklyn
Soccer players from New York City
United States Army Air Forces personnel of World War II
Association football forwards